Fara Tanya Franki Merrett MBE (born 25 January 1984) is an English former footballer who played as a central midfielder for multiple clubs, as well as the England national team. A consistent goalscorer and set-piece specialist, Williams was considered one of England's leading players. After making her senior debut in 2001, Williams earned 172 caps for the England Women's Team, making her their highest capped player. She played at the 2005, 2009, 2013 and 2017 European Championships, as well as the World Cups in 2007, 2011 and 2015. Williams also featured for Team GB at the 2012 London Olympics.

Williams' club career started with Chelsea then she progressed to Charlton Athletic in 2001. She signed for Everton in 2004 and later became the captain of the club, winning the Premier League Cup in 2008 and the FA Women's Cup in 2010. After eight years with Everton she signed for local rivals Liverpool in 2012 and won the league title in 2013 and 2014. Williams was named The Football Association (FA) Young Player of the Year in 2002, FA Players' Player of the Year in 2009 and FA International Player of the Year in both 2007 and 2009.

Club career
Williams attended Shene School in Richmond, London and joined Chelsea Ladies under–14s at the age of 12. She scored 30 goals for Chelsea's first team in 2000–01 and signed for Charlton Athletic Ladies during the following season. She won Charlton's Player of the Year and the FA Women's Young Player of the Year in her first season, 2001–02.

A back injury ruled Williams out of much of the 2002–03 season. In May 2003 Williams scored an unfortunate own goal three minutes after coming on as a substitute in Charlton's 3–0 FA Women's Cup final defeat to Fulham. She headed a corner from Fulham's Rachel Unitt – Williams' England teammate and then flatmate – into her own net.

In 2003–04 Williams returned to form and was an important part of the Charlton Athletic side who challenged for all three domestic trophies. She started Charlton's second successive FA Women's Cup final in May 2004, but suffered another 3–0 defeat as Julie Fleeting scored a hat-trick for Arsenal. Although Arsenal also pipped Charlton to the League title by a single point, Williams collected an FA Women's Premier League Cup winners' medal when Charlton beat Fulham 1–0 at Underhill in March 2004.

Williams surprisingly moved to Everton Ladies in summer 2004, where fans gave her the nickname "Queen Fara". In 2004–05 Williams lost her third FA Women's Cup final in a row, to former club Charlton. She won another League Cup medal in 2007–08 as Everton defeated Arsenal at Brisbane Road. Williams missed two penalties, one in normal time and one in the shoot-out, as Everton were edged out by Leeds in the FA Women's Cup semi-final at Haig Avenue. In 2008–09 Everton missed out on the League title on goal difference after a final day defeat to Arsenal. However, Williams' performances saw her voted FA Players' Player of the Year.

On 23 September 2009 Williams was picked in the Women's Professional Soccer (WPS) International Draft by Philadelphia Independence. She was due to join up with her England teammate Lianne Sanderson in America, before deciding to stay with Everton. Williams' loyalty was rewarded with another two Cup finals in 2010: a defeat to Leeds Carnegie in the Premier League Cup, in which Williams scored Everton's consolation, followed by a memorable extra–time win over Arsenal in the FA Women's Cup.

In November 2012 Williams and Natasha Dowie left Everton for local rivals Liverpool, who were hoping to build a squad capable of ending Arsenal's dominance of English women's football. Liverpool beat Bristol Academy 2–0 on the final day to secure the 2013 FA WSL league title.

Liverpool retained their title in 2014, but were much less successful in 2015. They finished seventh of eight teams as Williams missed three months of the season with a hamstring injury and coach Matt Beard departed for American National Women's Soccer League (NWSL) club Boston Breakers.

On 5 January 2016, Liverpool confirmed that Williams would be leaving the club to sign for deposed former champions Arsenal Ladies. Williams said: "I have really enjoyed my time at Liverpool Ladies and will take away some absolutely fantastic memories. When I first joined the Club the team had finished bottom of the league so to win back to back league titles was an incredible achievement."

On 16 August 2017, she left Arsenal Women to join Women's Super League (WSL) rivals Reading on a two-year deal.

In May 2019, she signed a new contract with Reading.

On 26 April 2021, Williams announced that she would be retiring from the game at the end of the 2020–21 season.

International career

England
Williams' senior England debut came aged 17 against Portugal in November 2001. During the return fixture in February 2002, her first start, Williams scored the opening goal from a free kick in a 3–0 win at Fratton Park.

Williams played in all three of England's group games at Women's Euro 2005, scoring a penalty in the 2–1 defeat to Denmark. She also scored five goals in helping England qualify for the World Cup in China, including two in the 13–0 win over Hungary. Williams forced the decisive own-goal in the play-off against France which sealed qualification.

She went on to play in all three of England's group games at the World Cup, and scored a penalty in England's 6–1 win over Argentina. However, she also picked up her second yellow card of the group stage in that match, and so missed the quarter-final defeat by the United States through suspension. On 23 May, Williams picked up the 2007 FA International Player of the Year Award.

On 8 May 2008 England played Belarus in the UEFA Women's Euro 2009 qualifying and Williams scored a hat-trick of long-range goals. In May 2009 Williams was again named FA International Player of the Year, and was also voted FA Players' Player of the Year.

At the Euro 2009 final tournament in Finland, Williams scored a penalty during England's first game against Italy. However, England lost the match 2–1 after Williams' error resulted in a red card for Casey Stoney. England improved and Williams, captain in the absence of the injured Faye White, scored in a 3–2 quarter final win over hosts Finland. She also featured in the semi-final win over the Netherlands and 6–2 final defeat by Germany.

Williams was England's top-scorer with seven goals during qualifying for the 2011 FIFA Women's World Cup. A knee injury sustained in a WSL match with Lincoln Ladies left her battling for fitness ahead of the finals. Despite this, Williams was "more than pleased" to be named in the squad on 10 June 2011. At the final tournament, she headed the first goal of England's campaign in the 1–1 draw with Mexico and also featured against New Zealand before being rested for the final group game, a 2–0 victory over Japan. Williams played 120 minutes in the quarter-final exit to France. She was not among the penalty takers in England's penalty shootout defeat.

Williams earned her 100th Cap in the 2012 Cyprus Cup against Switzerland on 1 March 2012. England won the game 1–0 with Williams proud to score the only goal of the game: "It's a massive achievement to reach 100 caps and getting the goal made it extra special." She was part of the England squad which performed poorly at UEFA Women's Euro 2013 and was eliminated in the first round.

On 3 August 2014, Williams led the England team out against Sweden and became the most capped player in the history of English football, with 130 Caps. England won the match 4–0 in Hartlepool.

At the 2015 FIFA Women's World Cup in Canada, Williams scored a 38th-minute penalty kick against Colombia, as England won 2–1 in Montreal on 17 June. In the semi-final in Edmonton on 2 July, Williams converted her second penalty of the tournament, in the 40th minute, to give England an equaliser against defending champions Japan. England lost the game 2–1. Two days later, and back in Edmonton, Williams scored another penalty, on this occasion in extra time, to give England the winning goal in a 1–0 victory over Germany. Her crucial goal gave England their first ever win over Germany and secured a bronze medal, the team's best ever finish at the FIFA Women's World Cup.

Williams was not included in England's squad for the 2019 FIFA Women's World Cup, but manager Phil Neville said her international career was not over.

International goals
Scores and results list England's goal tally first.

Great Britain Olympic
In June 2012, Williams was named in an 18-player Great Britain squad for the 2012 London Olympics.

Personal life
Williams was homeless for six years during the early part of her football career. She was later employed by FA as a skills coach. She has worked for the Homeless FA charity as a coach at Manchester United's The Cliff, and helping to select the England team for the Homeless World Cup.

Williams was appointed Member of the Order of the British Empire (MBE) in the 2016 New Year Honours for services to women's football and charity.

She supports Chelsea F.C.

In December 2015, she married former Everton teammate Amy Kane, but they separated a short time later.

Career statistics

Club

Honours
Everton
FA Women's Premier League Cup: 2007–08
FA Women's Cup: 2009–10
Liverpool
FA WSL: 2013, 2014
Arsenal
FA Women's Cup: 2015–16
England
Cyprus Cup: 2009, 2013, 2015
UEFA Women's Championship runner-up: 2009
FIFA Women's World Cup third place: 2015
Individual
 Liverpool Women's Player of the Season: 2015
 Women's Super League Hall of Fame: 2021

See also
 List of women's footballers with 100 or more caps

References

External links

Fara Williams  at the FA website
Everton FC official website

1984 births
Living people
English women's footballers
England women's international footballers
Everton F.C. (women) players
Arsenal W.F.C. players
Liverpool F.C. Women players
Chelsea F.C. Women players
Charlton Athletic W.F.C. players
Reading F.C. Women players
2011 FIFA Women's World Cup players
2015 FIFA Women's World Cup players
FIFA Century Club
Footballers at the 2012 Summer Olympics
Olympic footballers of Great Britain
Homeless people
Footballers from Battersea
Women's association football midfielders
Association footballers' wives and girlfriends
Members of the Order of the British Empire
Lesbian sportswomen
English LGBT sportspeople
British LGBT footballers
2007 FIFA Women's World Cup players
UEFA Women's Euro 2017 players
WSL Hall of Fame inductees